Retreat on the Rhine is a 1930 German musical comedy film directed by Jaap Speyer and starring Charlotte Susa, Hans Stüwe, and Hermann Böttcher. It was made as an operetta film which emerged as a popular genre following the arrival of sound film.

The film's sets were designed by Walter Reimann.

Cast

References

Bibliography

External links 
 

1930 films
1930 musical comedy films
Films of the Weimar Republic
German musical comedy films
1930s German-language films
Films directed by Jaap Speyer
Operetta films
German black-and-white films
1930s German films